The ETTU Cup is the second most important continental tournament for clubs in European table tennis, after the European Champions League. The European Table Tennis Union (ETTU) has organized this cup since the 1964-65 season for men teams, and also for women teams a year later.

Name
The competition was held in the 1964/65 season for the first time for men and a year later for ladies. At that time this tournament was called the European Fair Cities Cup. In 1984 it was renamed ETTU Nancy Evans Cup after the wife of then ITTF President Roy Evans. In 2005, the cup was renamed to the current name, the "ETTU Cup", while "Nancy Evans Cup" became the name of the trophy and is awarded to the winner. 

The winner's trophy donated by Hans Frieder Baisch and Klaus stallion.

Qualification
The winners of the ETTU Cup of the previous season qualifies automatically. Furthermore, every member association of ETTU can nominate up to 6 clubs to participate in the competition. Those six clubs should be taking part during the same season in the top national league, and should not be taking part in the European Champions League in the same season.

Format
The competition is organised in three stages:
 first stage: round robin group matches,
 second stage: round robin group matches, and
 third stage: straight knock-out system.

The champions and the runners-up of the previous season, with the six strongest remaining teams ranked by the Ranking Committee, qualify automatically to the last 16. If the champions or the runners-up do not enter the competition, the strongest remaining team would take its place. Eight further top teams according to the ranking list would enter the second round directly. 

In the first round, the competition is played in groups of three, four or five teams, with the clubs finishing in positions one and two in every group would qualify for the second round. In the second round the competition is played in groups of four teams. The teams finishing in position one in every group shall qualify for the round of the last sixteen. From this round onwards, a single knock-out system is used with eight teams drawn directly into this round. 

The semi-finals and finals will be played in two legs, home and away. If each team has won one leg, the winner would be the team with the better aggregate score first in individual matches, then in games and finally in points. If they are still equal, the winner shall be decided by lot.

Composition of teams
Each team should name at least six players for the competition. Within the list, only two foreign players are allowed, and, for any particular match, only one foreign player is permitted to participate.

Results

Men's competition

Women's competition

See also
 European Table Tennis Union
 List of table tennis players

References

External links
 Official ETTU Website
 Official regulation of ETTU Cup

Table tennis competitions
European international sports competitions